Marion County Airport  is a county-owned, public-use airport in Marion County, South Carolina, United States. It is located three nautical miles (6 km) east of the central business district of Marion, South Carolina. This airport is included in the National Plan of Integrated Airport Systems for 2011–2015, which categorized it as a general aviation facility.

Although many U.S. airports use the same three-letter location identifier for the FAA and IATA, this airport is assigned MAO by the FAA but has no designation from the IATA (which assigned MAO to Eduardo Gomes International Airport in Manaus, Amazonas, Brazil).

Facilities and aircraft 
Marion County Airport covers an area of 130 acres (53 ha) at an elevation of 92 feet (28 m) above mean sea level. It has one runway designated 4/22 with an asphalt surface measuring 4,504 by 100 feet (1,373 x 30 m).

For the 12-month period ending March 17, 2011, the airport had 6,000 aircraft operations, an average of 16 per day: 98% general aviation and 2% military. At that time there were 9 aircraft based at this airport: 89% single-engine and 11% multi-engine.

References

External links 
 Airport page at Marion County website
 Marion County Airport (MAO) at the South Carolina Aeronautics Commission
 Aerial image as of February 1994 from USGS The National Map
 

Airports in South Carolina
Transportation in Marion County, South Carolina